This is a list of butterflies native to the U.S state of Georgia.

References

See also 
 

Georgia
Butterflies